The Canadian pipe mine, also known as the McNaughton tube, was a type of landmine deployed in Britain during the invasion crisis of 1940–1941. It comprised a horizontally bored pipe packed with explosives, and once in place this could be used to instantly create an anti-tank obstacle or to ruin a road or runway thereby denying its use by an enemy.

Inception
In November 1939 Lieutenant-General Andrew McNaughton travelled to Toronto for a meeting with Lieutenant-Colonel Charles Hertzberg (Commanding Royal Engineers, CRE) and Lieutenant-Colonel Guy R. Turner, both of the 1st Canadian Infantry Division, Oliver Hall of the Mining Association of Ontario, and Colin Campbell, an experienced mining and construction engineer and Minister of Public Works under Ontario Premier Mitchell Hepburn. The meeting participants discussed military possibilities raised by experimental diamond drilling, an initiative that had been broached by R.A. Bryce, president of the Ontario Mining Association, among others. McNaughton recognized the possibility of placing explosives under fortifications or introducing poison gas into them for military use.

As he prepared Canadian forces for departure to Britain, McNaughton proposed that a section of the 12th Field Company, Royal Canadian Engineers should be formed from experienced diamond drillers. He said: "We will start in a small way to see what is in the scheme and then expand if the results warrant it". McNaughton offered the command to Colin Campbell. Campbell accepted and initiated plans to obtain recruits from the mining districts of northern Ontario.

McNaughton, now General Officer Commanding (GOC) of the 1st Canadian Infantry Division, travelled to Britain with his staff and the bulk of his division in December 1939. Early in January 1940 McNaughton inspected the Allied defences in northern France and on a four-day inspection of the Maginot Line he found defences to be unsatisfactory. He requested – and received – working drawings of fortifications so that his diamond drillers could help clear out German defenders if they captured portions of these areas.

At a meeting with senior British engineers at Aldershot, McNaughton suggested that the pipes might be used to construct surprise obstacles in front of a German advance. This would be accomplished by pushing pipes into the ground at a shallow angle and packing them with explosives ready to be detonated. The pipe could be easily and quickly pushed by a hydraulic jack fitted to a tank transporter, numbers of which were available. According to McNaughton's biographer, John Swettenham, he got the idea of using hydraulic jacks from the bootleggers of Windsor, Ontario who, during the prohibition, pushed pipes from a brewery to other premises where drink could be safely loaded.

Development
Colin Campbell and his section of diamond drillers arrived in England in February 1940. They started experimenting in a quarry near Aldershot. Campbell proved that his section could produce surprise obstacles that could not be crossed by a tank during a demonstration at Bourley Hill. Attendees promised to support McNaughton's proposal to expand the section into a tunnelling company.

In May 1940, McNaughton assigned the tunnelers a role in preparing defences in England and in May advised the War Office that "the detachment of 1 Canadian Tunnelling Company, intended for experimental work in France, should not now be sent but should be held for more important experimental work in England." With the fall of France, the tunnellers were employed in anti-invasion measures. McNaughton noticed that ditches were being dug across unused airstrips to deny their use by the enemy, even though the bombing of active airfields might make them urgently needed in the near future. By 18 June the Chief Engineer, Home Forces and the Inspector General of Fortifications were convinced of the benefits of the pushed pipes filled with explosives and set out to acquire large quantities of pipe for the purpose of destroying runways at short notice. By the end of that month, the tunnelers successfully demonstrated "surprise" anti-tank obstacles near Shornmead Fort, Chatham.

This ditch would be sufficient to either stop a tank altogether or to force it be exposed to anti-tank weapons for several minutes as it effected a crossing. Pipe pushing machines were used to drill into the approaches to bridges or embankments and left ready for instantaneous demolition.

Originally known as the Canadian Pipe Mine, it was later named the McNaughton Tube Tank Obstacle in honour of the commander of the Canadian Corps, Lieutenant-General Andrew McNaughton.

On 9 August 1940, "McNaughton's secret A/T obstacle" was demonstrated to General Alan Brooke, Commander-in-Chief, Home Forces, and, as such, responsible for defence of the UK.

Tactical use 
A secret report emphasised the value of this obstacle:

Conventional anti-tank obstacles were very obvious from the air. These pipe mines had the advantage of being virtually invisible from the air, and so could be used when the enemy had been coaxed into a seemingly weak point in the defences. Furthermore, the mines could be set in place without interference to the normal use of the land, and so they were deployed under roads and railways that might need to be blocked in an instant, and runways that may need to be denied to the enemy at short notice.

Problems 
McNaughton's tubes were found to have significant defects. Blasting gelatine explosives were expected to remain potent for several years, but in 1941 it was evident that the explosives in some of the tubes had been affected by water, losing power significantly. A brass spearhead on a long rod was provided for withdrawing the explosives from the tubes, but in some cases the explosive had deteriorated into a porridge-like mush. Second Lieutenant Cameron, who as a civilian was an experienced oil drilling engineer, suggested washing out the explosives with water delivered by a narrow diameter tube pushed down the main pipe.  The mush, along with globules of nitro-glycerine, was caught in burlap bags for disposal.  The original pipes were then re-charged with stable explosives.

After the end of the war, Canadian pipe mine installations were removed. However, a small number were missed and rediscovered many years later. It was necessary to deal with discovered mines with great care. In April 2006, 20 unexploded pipe mines were discovered under a runway at a former Royal Navy air base, HMS Daedalus, Lee-on-Solent, Hampshire. Their removal, thought to be the largest of its kind in peacetime Britain, led to the evacuation of some 900 homes staggered over a 5-week period. The mines were destroyed by controlled explosion.

See also 
Bangalore torpedo
British anti-invasion preparations of World War II
British hardened field defences of World War II
Camouflet

References

Footnotes

Citations

General references 

Collections

 WW2 People's War is an online archive of wartime memories contributed by members of the public and gathered by the BBC.

Anti-tank obstacles
Area denial weapons
Land mines
World War II military equipment of the United Kingdom
Weapons and ammunition introduced in 1940
Canadian inventions